Cyllaraxis is a moth genus in the family Autostichidae. It contains the species Cyllaraxis cambyses, which is found in Iran.

References

Holcopogoninae